Olga Petrovna Konysheva (born 29 May 1972) is a Kazakhstani ice hockey player and member of the Kazakh national ice hockey team,  playing in the European Women's Hockey League (EWHL) with Aisulu Almaty. A twenty-two season competitor with the Kazakh national team, she represented Kazakhstan in the women's ice hockey tournament at the 2002 Winter Olympics in Salt Lake City and at fifteen IIHF Women's World Championships, including at the Top Division tournaments in 2001, 2005, 2009, and 2011. She is a three-time Asian Winter Games medalist, having won gold medals at the women's ice hockey tournaments in 2003 and 2011, and a bronze medal in 2017.

References

External links
 

1972 births
Living people
Kazakhstani women's ice hockey forwards
Olympic ice hockey players of Kazakhstan
Ice hockey players at the 2002 Winter Olympics
Asian Games gold medalists for Kazakhstan
Asian Games bronze medalists for Kazakhstan
Medalists at the 2003 Asian Winter Games
Medalists at the 2011 Asian Winter Games
Medalists at the 2017 Asian Winter Games
Asian Games medalists in ice hockey
Ice hockey players at the 2003 Asian Winter Games
Ice hockey players at the 2011 Asian Winter Games
Ice hockey players at the 2017 Asian Winter Games
Sportspeople from Almaty
European Women's Hockey League players